TSS may refer to:

Organizations 
 Tanglin Secondary School, a government secondary school in Clementi, Singapore
 The Southport School, Anglican day and boarding school on Gold Coast, Queensland, Australia
 Tinana State School, a public primary school in Maryborough, Queensland, Australia
 Thornhill Secondary School, in Canada
 Tideway Scullers School, a rowing club in London, England
 Telangana Sports School, a sports school in Hyderabad, India
 Times Square Stores, a US retail department store chain
 Technical Services Staff, a component of the U.S. Central Intelligence Agency
 TV Shinhiroshima, a TV station in Japan
 Total System Services, Inc. (NYSE symbol)
 Ton Steine Scherben, a German rock band

Science and technology
 Traffic Separation Scheme, a traffic-management route-system ruled by the International Maritime Organization
 TSS-1, Tethered Satellite System-1, a 1990s joint space experiment program between Italy and USA flying a space tether
 TSS-1R, reflight of the Tethered Satellite System mission
 Tromsø Satellite Station, a satellite earth station located in Tromsø, Norway
 Toxic shock syndrome, a potentially fatal illness caused by a bacterial toxin
 Transcription start site, the starting point of the process of creating a complementary RNA copy of a sequence of DNA
 TSS (operating system), an early time-sharing operating system on the IBM System/360 Model 67 and System/370
 Task State Segment, a special structure on x86-based computers which holds information about a task
 Total sum of squares, a quantity that appears as part of a standard way of presenting results
 Total suspended solids, a water quality measurement
 TATSU Signing Server, an Apple server which controls whether iOS versions can be restored to
 TCG Software Stack, a software stack by TCG that allows interaction with a TPM
 Texas Supernova Search, a program to search for new supernovae and other astronomical transients

Transport
 Tsing Shan Tsuen stop, Hong Kong (MTR station code TSS)
 Twin-screw steamer, a steam-powered vessel with two screw propellers
 Toyota Safety System